Pantaron Mountain Range, also called the Central Cordillera of Mindanao, Philippines is a mountain range straddling across the provinces of Misamis Oriental, Bukidnon, Agusan del Norte, Agusan del Sur, Davao del Norte and Davao del Sur. The range contains one of the last remaining old growth or primary forest blocks in Mindanao. Major rivers on the island also have their headwaters on the mountain range, including Mindanao River, Pulangi River, Davao River, Tagoloan River and major tributaries of Agusan River.

The mountain range has been noted for its cultural and biological diversity. Ethnic tribal communities such as the Manobos, Higaonons, and Bukidnons are the inhabitants of the area. Ancestral domain claims within the boundaries of the mountain range have also been identified by the government for these Lumad minorities.

Pantaron Mountain Range is one of the Philippines' few remaining biodiversity corridors with old growth forests. It is home to rare species of flora and fauna, including the critically endangered Philippine eagle and of other endemic and vulnerable fauna such as the Philippine brown deer, the Philippine flying lemur, and a Mindanao-endemic gymnure. The forests are threatened by mining and logging.

See also
Nepenthes malimumuensis
Nepenthes cabanae
Bai Bibyaon Ligkayan Bigkay, environmentalist, defender of Manobo ancestral lands and the Pantaron Mountain Range

References

Mountain ranges of the Philippines
Landforms of Agusan del Norte
Landforms of Agusan del Sur
Landforms of Misamis Oriental
Landforms of Bukidnon
Landforms of Davao del Norte
Landforms of Davao del Sur